Arthur William Upfield (1 September 1890 – 12 February 1964) was an English-Australian writer, best known for his works of detective fiction featuring Detective Inspector Napoleon "Bony" Bonaparte of the Queensland Police Force, a mixed-race Indigenous Australian. His books were the basis for a 1970s Australian television series entitled Boney, as well as a 1990 telemovie and a 1992 spin-off TV series.

Born in England, Upfield moved to Australia in 1911 and fought with the Australian military during the First World War. Following his war service, he travelled extensively throughout Australia, obtaining a knowledge of Australian Aboriginal culture that he would later use in his written works. In addition to writing detective fiction, Upfield was a member of the Australian Geological Society and was involved in numerous scientific expeditions.

In The Sands of Windee, a story about a "perfect murder", Upfield invented a method to destroy carefully all evidence of the crime. Upfield's "Windee method" was used in the Murchison Murders, and because Upfield had discussed the plot with friends, including the man accused of the murders, he was called to give evidence in court. 
The episode is dramatised in the film 3 Acts of Murder starring Robert Menzies.

Early life 
Upfield was born in Gosport, Hampshire, England, on 1 September 1890. His father was a draper. In 1911, after he did poorly in examinations towards becoming a real estate agent, Upfield's father sent him to Australia.

With the outbreak of World War I, he joined the First Australian Imperial Force on 23 August 1914. He sailed from Brisbane on 24 September 1914 to Melbourne. At the time of sailing he had the rank of Driver and was with the Australian 1st Light Horse Brigade Train (5 Company ASC [Army Service Corps]). In Melbourne he was at a camp for several weeks before sailing to Egypt. He fought at Gallipoli and in France and married an Australian nurse, Ann Douglass, in Egypt in 1915. He was discharged in England on 15 October 1919. Before returning to Australia, Ann gave birth to their only child, James Arthur, born 8 February 1920.

For most of the next 20 years he travelled throughout the outback, working at a number of jobs and learning about Aboriginal cultures. A contributor of an article 'Coming Down with Cattle' to the first edition of Walkabout magazine, he later used the knowledge and material he had gathered in his books.

Career
Upfield created the character of Detective Inspector Napoleon Bonaparte, based on a man known as "Tracker Leon", whom he said he had met in his travels. Leon was supposedly a half-caste employed as a tracker by the Queensland Police. He was also said to have read Shakespeare and a biography of Napoleon, and to have received a university education. However, there is no evidence that any such person ever existed. The novels featuring Bony, as the detective was also known, were far more successful than any other writings by Upfield.

Late in life Upfield became a member of the Australian Geological Society, involved in scientific expeditions. He led a major expedition in 1948 to northern and western parts of Australia, including the Wolfe Creek Crater, which was a setting for his novel The Will of the Tribe published in 1962.

After living at Bermagui, New South Wales, Upfield moved to Bowral. Upfield died at Bowral on 12 February 1964. His last work, The Lake Frome Monster, published in 1966, was completed by J.L. Price and Dorothy Stange.

In 1957, Jessica Hawke published a biography of the author entitled Follow My Dust!. It is generally held, however, that this was written by Upfield himself.

Works 
Upfield's novels were held in high regard by some fellow writers. In 1987, H. R. F. Keating included The Sands of Windee in his list of the 100 best crime and mystery books ever published. J. B. Priestley wrote of Upfield: "If you like detective stories that are something more than puzzles, that have solid characters and backgrounds, that avoid familiar patterns of crime and detection, then Mr Upfield is your man." His grandson, William Arthur Upfield holds his grandfather's copyright, and the trademark 'Bony', keeping the works in print.

The American mystery novelist Tony Hillerman praised Upfield's works. In his introduction to the posthumous 1984 reprint of Upfield's A Royal Abduction, he described the seduction in his youth of Upfield's descriptions of both the harsh outback areas, and "the people who somehow survived upon them ... When my own Jim Chee of the Navaho Tribal Police unravels a mystery because he understands the ways of his people, when he reads the signs in the sandy bottom of a reservation arroyo, he is walking in the tracks Bony made 50 years ago."

His Bony books were translated into German for the Goldmanns Taschenkrimi Series in the late  50s and  early 60s. They were widely read and quite successful.

Books

Television series
From 1972 to 1973, Fauna Productions (also responsible for Skippy the Bush Kangaroo) produced a 26-episode television series. After a long search for a half-white, half-Aborigine actor, the producers chose English actor Jon Finch for the role of Detective Inspector Napoleon Bonaparte. When he suddenly became unavailable, Fauna's John McCallum flew to London in panic and was lucky enough to audition New Zealand actor James Laurenson on his last day there. Offered the lead role, Laurenson hurriedly flew to Australia, reading "Bony" books all the way over.

The series was called Boney, partly to make the pronunciation of the name obvious, and partly because that had been Upfield's original intention – a publisher's misprint on the first novel had renamed the character. Most of the episodes were based directly on one of the novels, but there were some adaptations. Two original scripts were not directly based on any novel; five novels were not adapted for television, effectively "reserving" them in case a third series was produced. At the time, many of the books were reprinted with the spelling altered to "Boney" on the covers (although retaining the original in the text), and featuring a photo from the relevant episode.

Bony was also a 1990 telemovie and later a 1992 spin-off TV series (using the original "Bony" spelling). However, the series was criticised for casting Bony as a white man (played by Cameron Daddo), under the tutelage of "Uncle Albert", an elderly Aborigine played by Burnum Burnum.

Short Stories 
His Last Holiday. Brisbane Daily Standard, 14 January 1916
The Man Who Liked Work. Life, January 1928
Laffer's Gold. Western Mail, 22 December 1932
Rainbow Gold. Perth Sunday Times, 29 January 1933
[Title Unknown]. Jarrah Leaves, 30 November 1933
[Title Unknown]. Australian Journal, January 1934
[Title Unknown]. Australian Journal, October 1935
Henry's Last Job. Melbourne Herald, 14 February 1939
A Mover of Mountains. Melbourne Herald, 14 October 1939
Henry's Little Lamb. Melbourne Herald, 5 December 1939
Joseph Henry's Christmas Party. Melbourne Herald, 23 December 1939
Pinky Dick's Elixir. Melbourne Herald, 18 January 1940
Vital Clue. Melbourne Herald, 19 January 1940
Why Did the Devil Shoot a Pig?. Melbourne Herald, 29 January 1940
That Cow Maggie!! Melbourne Herald, 11 April 1940
The Great Rabbit Lure. Melbourne Herald, 19 April 1940
The Colonel's Horse. ABC Weekly, 5 January 1941
The Cairo Spy. ABC Weekly, 5 July 1941
Through Flood and Desert for Twopence. ABC Weekly, 26 October 1941
White Quartz. Adelaide Chronicle, 21 November 1946
M-U-R-D-E-R at Split Point. Melbourne Argus, 27 December 1952 to 2 January 1953. (Heavily edited version of The New Shoe)

Non-Fiction 
All Must Pay: Reflections on Outpost. Melbourne Argus, 8 January 1916
Little Stories of Gallipoli. Melbourne Argus, 10, 14, 19 and 21 January 1916
The Blight. Barrier Miner, 4, 11, 18 and 25 October 1924
’’At School Today and Forty Years Ago’’. West Australian, 10 March 1928
’’The Loneliest Job on Earth’’. Wide World Magazine, December 1928
Reynard the Killer: A Growing Menace to Pastoralists: Bush Life Becoming Extinct. Perth Sunday Times, 31 August 1930
Aboriginal Philosophy. West Australian, 20 September 1930
Face and Clothes. West Australian, 22 November 1930
’’Eucla - An Abandoned Township and it’s Ghost’’. Empire Review, December 1930
Sep-Ah-Rate. West Australian, 17 October 1931
Some Reflections on a Hilltop: The Charm of the Ranges: A Nomad's Heart Responds. Perth Daily News, 9 July 1932
Lords of the Track: Sundowners I Have Met: Nicknames and Fads. Perth Daily News, 30 July 1932
After Rain: Charms of Hill and Gully: The Song of the Brook Perth Daily News, 6 August 1932
Street Mysteries: Sidelights in the Study of Humanity. Perth Sunday Times, 18 September 1932
The Hunted Emu: A Rural Pest Which Is a Pest Destroyer. Perth Sunday Times, 13 November 1932
Kangaroo Coursing: The Thrill of a Blind Chase. West Australian, 19 November 1932
Christmas Memories. Perth Daily News, 24 December 1932
Plagues of Australia: Wonders of Animal Migration. West Australian, 31 December 1932
Literary Illusions: Some Experiences of an Author - and Others. Perth Sunday Times, 1 January 1933
Way for the Pioneers! Migration Needs a New Deal. Melbourne Herald, 3 January 1933
Australia. West Australian, 14 January 1933
Let Us Go Beachcombing: The Perfect Dream for Hot Weather Days. Perth Daily News, 9 February 1933
The Man Who Thought He Was Dead. Melbourne Herald, 28 October 1933
Future of the Aborigines: New Protective Laws Required. Perth Daily News, 2 November 1933
Found - An Old Tyre! A Problem of the Bush. Melbourne Herald, 11 November 1933
Lonely Terrors of the Bush! The Man Who Lost Count! Melbourne Herald, 25 November 1933
Untitled article. Brisbane Sunday Mail, 26 November 1933
Justice for the Black. Try New Treatment! Melbourne Herald, 1 December 1933
Land of Illusions: Do We Expect Too Much from the Northern Territory: Dangers of Boosting. Melbourne Herald, 19 December 1933
My Life Outback: Surveyor, Cook and Raw Boundary Rider: The Breaking-in Begins. Melbourne Herald, 12 January 1934
Poison! Tales of the Nonchalant Bush. Melbourne Herald, 13 January 1934
Outback Adventures of a 'New Chum': A Dream and the Sad Awakening. Adelaide Advertiser, 13 January 1934
My Life Outback, No. 2: Mule Driver's Outsider: On the Track with One-Spur Dick. Melbourne Herald, 13 January 1934
My Life Outback No. 3: Opal Gouging with Big Jack - and His Cat: How Joke on New Chums Became Good Turn. Melbourne Herald, 15 January 1934
My Life Outback, No. 7: When Crabby Tom Ran Amok. Melbourne Herald, 19 January 1934
Up and Down Australia, No. 1: Going Bush. West Australian, 26 January 1934
Kangaroo Coursing. Melbourne Herald, 27 January 1934
My Life Outback, No. 8: Sand-storm Terror in Sturts County, No. 8. Melbourne Herald, 29 January 1934
My Life Outback, No. 11: The Murchison Bones Murder Case. Melbourne Herald, 24 January 1934
Up and Down Ausrealia, No. 2: Mule Driver's Offsider. West Australian, 2 February 1934
My Life Outback, No. 5: Tramping by the Darling. Adelaide Advertiser, 10 February 1934
My Old Pal Buller: Two Camels and - a Scorpion. Melbourne Herald, 10 March 1934
Plot for a Murder Mystery: Planning a Perfect Crime. Adelaide Advertiser, 17 March 1934
The Real Australia: The Sheep They Couldn't Kill. Melbourne Herald, 17 March 1934
The Real Australia: How They Waited for the Rain: The Courage of One Woman. Melbourne Herald, 31 March 1934
Challenging America! How the Yacht Endeavour was Built. Melbourne Herald, 9 June 1934
Work of the Bird gatherer. Adelaide Chronicle, 11 July 1934
Fun For The Afternoon! The Tale of an Intelligent Bull in the Outback. Melbourne Herald, 28 July 1934
A Tale of Two Worlds. Melbourne Herald, 9 August 1934
Ringers of the Bells: Secrets of an Ancient Art. Melbourne Herald, 17 November 1934
Black Man's Eldorado: Rich Reefs of the Imagination. Adelaide Chronicle, 16 May 1935
The Real Australia. Adelaide Chronicle, 13 June 1935
Walls of China. Melbourne Herald, 6 November 1937
His Majesty - The Swordfish. Melbourne Herald, 24 March 1938
The Art of Writing Mystery Stories. Adelaide Advertiser, 20 July 1940
The Impossible Perfect Crime. Adelaide Chronicle, 8 December 1949

References

Further reading 
 de Hoog, Kees & Hetherington, Carol (editors) (2012). Investigating Arthur Upfield: A Centenary Collection of Critical Essays. Newcastle upon Tyne: Cambridge Scholars Publishing. . These critical essays mark the centenary of Upfield's arrival in Australia from England on 4 November 1911.

External links 

Arthur W. Upfield, Creator of Detective Inspector Napoleon Bonaparte (Bony) of the Queensland Police
Travis B. Lindsey, Arthur William Upfield: A Biography. Thesis for Ph.D. degree, Monash University, 2005.

1890 births
1964 deaths
20th-century Australian novelists
20th-century Australian male writers
20th-century English novelists
Australian crime writers
Australian crime fiction writers
Australian mystery writers
Australian male novelists
Australian military personnel of World War I
English crime writers
English emigrants to Australia
People from Bowral
People from Gosport
20th-century English male writers
Australian Army soldiers
Military personnel from Hampshire